Wadbilliga National Park is a  national park that is located in high country spanning the Monaro and South Coast regions of south-eastern New South Wales, Australia.

Location and features
The nearest towns are Narooma and Cobargo in the east, and Cooma on the plateau in the west.

Wadbilliga is a wilderness area, and much of its protected area is in a near pristine state. Featuring rugged gorges and gullies. Suited to overnight camping and wilderness walking (only for the most experienced and well prepared). Areas of interest include the Tuross Falls, the Tuross River Gorge and Brogo Wilderness Area. The Wadbilliga Track is a scenic four wheel drive road which travels up the escarpment from east to west.

Wadbilliga is in a remote part of Australia, and has had little influence from mankind in the history of European settlement. In recent decades, it has become protected, and has intentionally been left in a natural state.

The average summer temperature is between 8 ° C and 23 ° C, and the winter temperature is -3 ° C and 10 ° C. The minimum elevation of the terrain is 15 m, and the maximum elevation is 1335 m.

Flora 
The undulating plateaux and steep gullies provide a variety of different habitats. Pinkwood rainforests occur in the sheltered fire free gullies. Black Ash, Monkey Gum, Messmate, White Ash and Snow Gums occur at higher altitudes.  Yellow Box, Manna Gum and Forest Red Gum forests are found at lower altitudes. Other habitats include bogs, dry exposed eucalyptus woodland, riverside forest, swamps and heaths. Rare plants occurring in Wadbilliga National Park include the Deua Gum and the small shrub, Kunzea badjaensis.

Fauna 
The bird and animal life is relatively undisturbed in this area. Over 122 native species of birds have been recorded here. Common animals include wombats, kangaroos, wallabies, possums of various types, platypus, echidna and many more.

Gallery

See also
 Protected areas of New South Wales (Australia)
 Bemboka River

References

External links
 National Parks website

National parks of New South Wales
South Coast (New South Wales)
Protected areas established in 1979
1979 establishments in Australia